Durham Amateur Rowing Club is a rowing club on the River Wear, based at City Boathouse, Green Lane, Old Elvet, Durham, County Durham.

History
The club was founded in 1860 and is affiliated to British Rowing. The original boathouse was built in 1897 near Prebends Bridge and this existed until 1970 when a second boathouse was constructed on the current site. On 14 September 2007 the boathouse was rebuilt.

The club has produced multiple British champions.

Honours

British champions

References

Sport in Durham, England
Sport in County Durham
Rowing clubs in England
Rowing clubs of the River Wear
Durham, England